Carabus bessarabicus concretus is a subspecies of ground beetle in the family Carabidae that can be found in Russia, Kazakhstan, Kyrgyzstan and Ukraine. They are blackish-gray coloured.

References

bessarabicus concretus
Beetles described in 1823